The 1940 United States presidential election in Washington took place on November 5, 1940, as part of the 1940 United States presidential election. Voters chose eight representatives, or electors, to the Electoral College, who voted for president and vice president.

Washington was won by incumbent President Franklin D. Roosevelt (D–New York), running with Secretary Henry A. Wallace, with 58.22% of the popular vote, against Wendell Willkie (R–New York), running with Minority Leader Charles L. McNary, with 40.58% of the popular vote.

Results

Results by county

See also
 United States presidential elections in Washington (state)

References

Washington (state)
1940
1940 Washington (state) elections